The Hungarian Canoe Federation (MKKSZ) is the governing body of Canoe in Hungary. It organizes the Hungarian representation at international competitions and the Hungarian National Championships.

The Federation was formed on July 30 1941 in Budapest. It became a member of the International Canoe Federation and of the European Canoe Association.

International competitions in Hungary
World Championships:
1998 ICF Canoe Sprint World Championships – Szeged, 3-6 September
2006 ICF Canoe Sprint World Championships – Szeged, 17-20 August
2011 ICF Canoe Sprint World Championships – Szeged, 17-21 August
2019 ICF Canoe Sprint World Championships – Szeged, 

European Championships:
2002 Canoe Sprint European Championships – Szeged, 18-21 July

International achievements

Olympic Games

World Championships

European Championships

Notable kayakers, canoers

Canoe (C)
Men's

Women's

Kayak (K)
Men's

Women's

Presidents

Current sponsorships
A-Híd - Official sponsor
Gránit Bank - Official sponsor
Mercedes-Benz - Official sponsor
Nelo - Official sponsor
Plastex - Official sponsor
Adidas - Official sponsor
MTVA - Official sponsor
Hungaroplakát - Official sponsor
Nemzeti Sport - Official sponsor
Rádió88 - Official sponsor
Inforádió - Official sponsor
Over magazin - Official sponsor
Tara Strong - Big fan

External links
Magyar Kajak-Kenu Szövetség (official website) 

National members of the European Canoe Association
Canoeing
1941 establishments in Hungary